Stjepan Bobek (3 December 1923 – 22 August 2010) was a Croatian and Yugoslav professional football striker and later football manager.

Usually a forward or attacking midfielder, Bobek was renowned for his technique, vision and goalscoring ability and is commonly regarded as one of Yugoslavia's greatest players. He is remembered for his time at the Serbian side Partizan, where he moved to following the end of World War II. He played for Partizan between 1945 and 1959 helping them win two Yugoslav First League titles and four Yugoslav Cups, and was named the club's greatest player in history in 1995. Internationally, he is the second all-time top scorer for the Yugoslavia national team, scoring 38 goals in 63 appearances between 1946 and 1956, and was member of Yugoslav squads which won two Olympic silver medals (in 1948 and 1952) and played in two FIFA World Cups (in 1950 and 1954).

After retiring from active football in 1959, he was a successful manager, winning Yugoslav and Greek national titles with Partizan and Panathinaikos.

Club career
Bobek was born in Zagreb and started playing at the age of 13 for Viktorija, a lower league club, using his brother's registration papers. When he was 20 he became the center-forward of Građanski Zagreb.

He also played for Croatia U21 between 1943 and 1945.

He was the top scorer of the Yugoslav First League twice, in 1945 (25 goals) and 1954 (21 goals).

Partizan
He came to FK Partizan in 1945 and played for them until 1958. During his time in Partizan, he played 468 games and scored 403 goals, still holding the club record. Bobek won two Yugoslav League titles and the Yugoslav Cup four times.

He scored his first goals in official matches, on 1 September 1946, in 2nd leg of Yugoslav First League. He scored a twice in a 6–1 home victory over Budućnost. On 5 January 1947, Bobek scored his first goal, in first Eternal derby against Red Star Belgrade, in 3–4 home defeat. That was also first goal in Derby, scored by Partizan player, because previous two was a own goals. On 8 June 1947 in a league match played in Niš between 14. Oktobar and Partizan (1–10), Bobek scored eight goals – an absolute record that has never been broken until the end of Yugoslav First League or its successor leagues. He scored 25 goals in 22 matches in first season of First League of SFR Yugoslavia and also won first title and gave a great contribution.

In May 1951, Partizan played three friendly matches in England. The first match was played on 9 May, against Hull City and Partizan beat them 3–2. Bobek played brilliant and scored two goals in great victory. Three days later he again played brilliant match and scored a one goal in second Partizan's victory, over English teams. The result was the same like three days before, but this time against Middlesbrough. One month later, he scored a twice in one of the biggest victories in Eternal Derby, in a 6–1 home victory over Red Star. In November of that year, Bobek scored a six goals against Sloboda Titovo Užice, in a qualifying round of Yugoslav Cup, in a 11–1 away victory. A week later, he also set a record in Yugoslav Cup. He scored eight goals in 15–0 home victory over Sloga Petrovac.

On 29 November 1952, Bobek scored a goal in a 6–0 victory over a arch rival Red Star Belgrade in the final of Yugoslav Cup. A three weeks before, he scored a hat-trick in a 4–0 home victory over one of the best German teams at that time – 1. FC Köln.

Bobek continued with great performances in next seasons. He scored a goal in biggest victory ever in Eternal Derby. After four minutes, he scored first goal on the match, in a 7–1 home victory over Red Star, on 6 December 1953. On 11 April 1954, he scored a four goals in 8–0 home league victory over Rabotnički.

Two years later after winning second Yugoslav Cup, he won a third. Again Partizan beat Red Star, but this time 4–1 and Bobek again scored one goal.

On 4 September 1955, Bobek scored a goal in first ever match of European Cup. Partizan draw (3–3) with Sporting CP, in Lisbon. He played all four matches in 1955–56 European Cup. Should be noted a legendary victory 3–0 over Real Madrid in quarter-finals.

International career
Bobek made his debut for the Yugoslavia national team on 9 May 1946, in a 2–0 win over Czechoslovakia at the Letná Stadium, which was the nation's inaugural match as SFR Yugoslavia. He scored his first international goal against the same opponents on 29 September 1946, in a 4–2 win at the JNA Stadium.

Bobek won two Olympic silver medals for Yugoslavia, scoring four goals in London 1948 and three in Helsinki 1952. He also appeared at the 1950 and 1954 FIFA World Cups, scoring once in a 1950 4–1 win over Mexico.

On 17 October 1954, Bobek scored a hat-trick in a 5–1 win over Turkey, which were also his last goals on international duty. He reached 38 goals for Yugoslavia on that day and became the national side's top scorer, surpassing Blagoje Marjanović's 37-goal tally. Bobek's record stood for over 66 years, until it was beaten by Serbia's Aleksandar Mitrović on 27 March 2021.

Managerial career
After retiring from the play, he became a football manager. In 1959 he became the coach of CWKS Warszawa in Poland, moving back to Yugoslavia the next season to manage FK Partizan. The team won three successive Yugoslav League championships under him, after which he was replaced by Kiril Simonovski in 1963. In 1964 he had another spell in Warsaw, and then he moved to Greece where he led Panathinaikos in the 1960s. During his time in Panathinaikos, the team won the first unbeaten championship in Greece, for the 1963-64 season. In the 1967–68 and 1968–69 seasons, he again returned to manage Partizan. In 1970, he moved to Olympiacos. In 1972, he was the manager of Dinamo Zagreb and during 1974–75 season of Panathinaikos for a second time, but without former success. He also coached Vardar and led them to 1978–79 Yugoslav Second League's East Division title and subsequent promotion to the First League.

In 1995, he was named the all-time greatest player of Partizan Belgrade. In 2009, Bobek's biography written by sports journalist Fredi Kramer was published.

Death
Bobek died shortly after midnight on 22 August 2010 in Belgrade. He is interred in the Alley of Distinguished Citizens in the Belgrade New Cemetery.

Career statistics

Club

International
This is the list of International Goals scored by Yugoslav forward Stjepan Bobek:

Honours

Player
Partizan
 Yugoslav First League: 1946–47, 1948–49
 Yugoslav Cup: 1947, 1952, 1954, 1956–57

Yugoslavia
 Olympic Silver Medal: 1948, 1952
 Balkan Cup runner-up: 1946 and 1947

Individual
 Yugoslav First League top scorer: 1945, 1953–54
 FK Partizan Magnificent Eleven (1995)
 FK Partizan Best player in club history (1995)

Records
 Yugoslavia all-time top scorer: 38 goals

Manager
Partizan
 Yugoslav First League (3): 1960–61, 1961–62, 1962–63

Panathinaikos
 Greek Championship (2): 1963–64, 1964–65
 Greek Cup (1): 1967

Vardar
 Yugoslav Second League (1): 1978–79

References

External links

 
 
 Stjepan Bobek international stats at Reprezentacija.rs 

1923 births
2010 deaths
Footballers from Zagreb
Croats of Serbia
Association football forwards
Yugoslav footballers
Yugoslavia international footballers
Croatian footballers
Croatia under-21 international footballers
Olympic medalists in football
Olympic footballers of Yugoslavia
Olympic silver medalists for Yugoslavia
Footballers at the 1948 Summer Olympics
Footballers at the 1952 Summer Olympics
Medalists at the 1948 Summer Olympics
Medalists at the 1952 Summer Olympics
1950 FIFA World Cup players
1954 FIFA World Cup players
FC Admira Wacker Mödling players
HŠK Građanski Zagreb players
FK Partizan players
Yugoslav First League players
Croatian expatriate footballers
Expatriate footballers in Austria
Croatian expatriate sportspeople in Austria
Yugoslav football managers
Legia Warsaw managers
FK Partizan managers
Panathinaikos F.C. managers
Olympiacos F.C. managers
Altay S.K. managers
GNK Dinamo Zagreb managers
Panetolikos F.C. managers
Espérance Sportive de Tunis managers
FK Vardar managers
FK Zemun managers
Yugoslav First League managers
Super League Greece managers
Yugoslav expatriate football managers
Expatriate football managers in Poland
Expatriate football managers in Greece
Expatriate football managers in Turkey
Expatriate football managers in Tunisia
Yugoslav expatriate sportspeople in Greece
Yugoslav expatriate sportspeople in Turkey
Yugoslav expatriate sportspeople in Tunisia
Burials at Belgrade New Cemetery